Allahabad UP Gramin Bank is a regional rural bank (RRB) in Uttar Pradesh, India.

The bank was established in 2010 with the amalgamation of the erstwhile Lucknow Kshetriya Gramin Bank and Sitapur and Triveni Kshetriya Gramin Bank, Orai. It is sponsored by Allahabad Bank. It was created under Gazette Notification of 2 March 2010 issued by the Indian Ministry of Finance under Sub-Section (1) of Section 23 A of the Regional Rural Bank Act, 1976 (21 of 1976). The bank is headquartered in Banda.

See also
 List of regional rural banks in Uttar Pradesh

References

External links
 Official website

Regional rural banks of Uttar Pradesh
2010 establishments in Uttar Pradesh
Companies based in Allahabad
Indian companies established in 2010
Banks established in 2010